Mike Gailey is a retired American soccer player. He played professionally in the National Professional Soccer League and USISL.

Youth
In 1988, Gailey graduated from Grimsley High School.  He attended the University of North Carolina Greensboro, playing on the men's soccer team from 1988 to 1991.  He led the NCAA Division I in scoring in 1991.

Professional
In the spring of 1993, Gailey turned professional with the Greensboro Dynamo of the USISL.  He would play for the Dynamo for four summer seasons.  In 1993, he was a Sizzlin’ Six All Star.  On November 5, 1993, Gailey signed with the Milwaukee Wave of the National Professional Soccer League.  He was named to the NPSL All Rookie Third Team.  In 1995, Gailey joined the Tampa Bay Terror where he played for the next two NPSL seasons.  In 1997, he played for the Seattle Sounders of the USISL A-League.  He was Second Team All League that season.  Gailey then spent the 1997–1998 indoor season with the Buffalo Blizzard before signing with the Charleston Battery in 1998.  After nine games, he moved to the Raleigh Flyers.  Gailey finished his career with the Atlanta Silverbacks in 1999.

External links
 1997 Seattle Sounders
 Charleston Battery: Mike Gailey
NC Soccer Hall of Fame Inductee 2020

References

Living people
1970 births
Atlanta Silverbacks players
Buffalo Blizzard players
North Carolina Fusion U23 players
Charleston Battery players
National Professional Soccer League (1984–2001) players
Raleigh Flyers players
Tampa Bay Terror players
Milwaukee Wave players
Seattle Sounders (1994–2008) players
Soccer players from North Carolina
UNC Greensboro Spartans men's soccer players
USISL players
A-League (1995–2004) players
Association football forwards
Sportspeople from Greensboro, North Carolina
Grimsley High School alumni